Hunhoff is a surname. Notable people with the surname include:

Bernie Hunhoff (born 1951), American politician
Jean Hunhoff (born 1953), American politician